Dimitrios Valvis (Δημήτριος Βάλβης; 1808 or 1814 – 30 November 1892) was a Greek politician and judge, who served briefly as Prime Minister of Greece in May 1886.

Early life and education

Valvis was born in Messolonghi and studied law in Pisa, Italy.

Career

Valvis served as President of the Court of Cassation from 1872 to 1885. He was appointed as a care-taker Prime Minister for a brief period in May 1886 between the ministries of Theodoros Deligiannis and Charilaos Trikoupis.

Personal life

He was the brother of Zinovios Valvis, who also served as Prime Minister of Greece on two occasions, in 1863 and 1864.

References

1808 births
1892 deaths
19th-century prime ministers of Greece
People from Missolonghi
Prime Ministers of Greece
Presidents of the Supreme Civil and Criminal Court of Greece